The following is a list of schools that participate in NCAA Division II softball, according to NCAA.com. These teams compete for the NCAA Division II Softball Championship. (For schools whose athletic branding does not directly correspond with the school name, the athletic branding is in parentheses.)

Conference affiliations reflect those in the 2023 season. Years of conference changes, indicated in footnotes, reflect softball seasons, which take place in the calendar year after a conference change takes effect.

Future programs

See also
 List of NCAA Division I softball programs
 List of NCAA Division III softball programs
 List of NAIA softball programs

References

N
NCAA Division II softball
Softball